Therevox builds custom musical instruments in Ontario, Canada. The company focuses on continuous-pitch instruments and is known for building a modern analog synthesizer inspired by the rare Ondes Martenot.

First commissioned in 2004 to build modern version of the Electro-Theremin as used by The Beach Boys on their 1966 single "Good Vibrations", only 12 of these instruments went to musicians and studios in North America and Europe. In 2010, Therevox was commissioned by Montreal's Breakglass Studio to design a new instrument that would combine the Ondes Martenot's au ruban and touche d’intensité interface with a dual oscillator analog synthesizer similar to the MiniMoog. The design included a built-in Spring Reverb and this prototype became the ET-4  model that has been available since 2012.

Some artists to feature the ET-4 include The Besnard Lakes, Belle & Sebastian, Brad Mehldau, Yann Tiersen, The Decemberists, Suuns, The Veils, Team Me, Iron & Wine, Floating Points, Sharon Van Etten, Joan Shelley (played by Jeff Tweedy), The Gertrudes, Chelsea Wolfe, Klô Pelgag, Wintersleep and Jason Isbell and The 400 Unit. The instrument has been a feature of OneRepublic's Native Tour and the ET-4 has also been used on soundtracks for Hulu's The Handmaid's Tale (TV series), Bad Banks, The Inventor: Out for Blood in Silicon Valley and horror film Nurse 3D starring Paz de la Huerta and the Salvatore Ferragamo inspired "White Shoe".

References

External links
Therevox : Custom Musical Instruments official website
Therevox - Wood & Wires documentary film

Continuous pitch instruments
Synthesizer manufacturing companies of Canada
Musical instrument manufacturing companies of Canada